San Lazzaro is a Roman Catholic church in Modena, Italy. It is all that now remains of the former lazaretto or lepers' hospital built to the east of the city in the 12th century.

References

Roman Catholic churches in Modena
13th-century Roman Catholic church buildings in Italy
Leper colonies